Christian Vincent (born 5 November 1955) is a French film director and screenwriter. He won the César Awards for Best Feature Film and Best Writing for his 1990 film La Discrète.

Filmography

External links 

1955 births
French film directors
French male screenwriters
French screenwriters
Living people